Vedran Kjosevski (born 22 May 1995) is a Bosnian professional footballer of Macedonian descent who plays as a goalkeeper.

Club career

Željezničar
Kjosevski joined Željezničar's youth academy in 2005 and came through all youth categories. He signed his first professional contract with the club on 28 May 2013. On 29 March 2014, he made his professional debut against Leotar at the age of 18.

In the following seasons, Kjosevski struggled to become first-choice goalkeeper, eventually securing that spot in 2016. On 14 August 2017, he signed a new three-year contract.

On 7 April 2018, he managed to score a goal against Široki Brijeg, which earned his team a point in the game. Later that season, Kjosevski won his first trophy with the club by beating Krupa in the Bosnian Cup final.

In July 2018, Kjosevski was named club captain. A few months later, he was stripped of captaincy and suspended due to breach of club's discipline. Shortly after, the suspension was lifted, but Kjosevski did not get his captaincy arm band back as teammate Sulejman Krpić was named new captain.

In April 2019, after poor showing in Željezničar's games, Kjosevski lost his first choice goalkeeper spot, eventually becoming the second choice goalkeeper after former teammate Irfan Fejzić became the new first choice goalkeeper in the team, and in the 2019–20 season, became the third choice goalkeeper after the signing of Serbian goalkeeper Filip Erić who became first choice and after 19 year old Jasmin Kršić became second choice.

After over 6 months of not playing any league matches for Željezničar, Kjosevski made his first league appearance in the 2019–20 season for the club on 30 November 2019, in Željezničar's 1–3 away win against fierce city rivals FK Sarajevo in the Sarajevo derby.

On 27 June 2020, it was announced that Kjosevski, alongside teammate Kemal Osmanković, had left the club after their contracts with Željezničar expired.

Velež Mostar
Nearly three months after leaving Željezničar, Kjosevski decided to stay in Bosnian football, signing a two-year contract with Velež Mostar on 25 September 2020. He made his official debut for Velež in a league game against Radnik Bijeljina, on 27 February 2021. Kjosevski left the club in June 2021.

International career
Kjosevski represented Bosnia and Herzegovina on various youth levels.

In March 2018, after Jasmin Burić got injured, he received  his first senior call-up, for friendly games against Bulgaria and Senegal.

Kjosevski is still eligible to represent North Macedonia as his birth country.

Career statistics

Club

Honours
Željezničar
Bosnian Cup: 2017–18

References

External links

Vedran Kjosevski at Soccerway

1995 births
Living people
Sportspeople from Veles, North Macedonia
Macedonian emigrants to Bosnia and Herzegovina
Bosnia and Herzegovina footballers
Bosnia and Herzegovina youth international footballers
Bosnia and Herzegovina under-21 international footballers
Association football goalkeepers
FK Željezničar Sarajevo players
FK Velež Mostar players
Premier League of Bosnia and Herzegovina players
Bosnia and Herzegovina people of Macedonian descent